Life... But How to Live It? was a Norwegian band, formed in Oslo in 1988. They played their first show at UFFA, Trondheim October 22, 1988, and their final show at Kampen Verksted, Oslo, April 2, 1994.

History

The band was formed in summer 1988. The members all frequented Blitz, a squatted building in the middle of Oslo, where many other notable Norwegian hardcore bands such as So Much Hate and Stengte Dører had their base in the late eighties. LBHTLI toured extensively, nearly 300 concerts in fifteen countries in the five years they kept together and released a live album on Your Choice Records, produced by Tobby Holzinger. They split up in 1994.

They have reformed to play three concerts since the breakup: once in 2002 celebrating Blitz's 20th anniversary, and twice in 2008.

After breakup
Andreassen and Andreassen later went on to play with Captain Not Responsible, Drunk and Danger!Man. Dyret also played Captain Not Responsible as well as Mitti Skritti and 2:20. In 2010, Osvold was a founding member of Castro. In 2015, she appeared on episode 2 of Norwegian documentary series Punx.

Influence
Their song "Green" was played on G7 Welcoming Committee's fourth podcast.

Members
 Katja Benneche Osvold – Vocals
 Roger Andreassen – Guitars
 Tom Andreassen - Bass
 Geir Petter "Dyret" (Norwegian for "animal") Jenssen - Drums

Discography

Albums
 LP - Life, But How To Live It? (X-Port Plater 1989)
 LP - Day By Day (Konkurrel 1990)
 CD/LP - Ugly (Progress Records / RPN Records / Boss Tuneage 1992)

Singles
 7"  - Green (Beri-Beri Records 1990)
 7"  - Burn (Beri-Beri Records 1991)

Live albums
 LP - Your Choice Live Series Vol.03 (Your Choice Records 1989)
 CD - This Might Be My Second Last Beer (Zone Productions 1994)

Compilations
 CD - Green / Burn (Fuck You All Records / Boss Tuneage 1992) (the two 7"s on one CD)
 LP - Life But How To Live It? (Ebullition 1994) (the Green/Burn CD from 1992 on LP.)
 CD - Life, But How To Live It? (Progress Records 1996)  The two first LPs on one CD.

Featured on
 LP - Blitz Hits (Blitz Recordings 1989)
 10"- It's Your Choice (Your Choice Records 1991). Various songs from the Your Choice Live Series.
 CD - Life Is Change Vol 2 (Beri-Beri Records 1991).
 CD - Subbacultcha
 CD - Svarte Pantere (Sound-track) (Polygram Records 1992).
 CD - Blitz - 10 år på pur faen (Progress Records 1992).
 7" - Ox EP Free with the German "Ox Fanzine" in 1992.
 CD - Free with Rock Furore (Norwegian Music Magazine, nr 4-1992).
 CD - Planet Progress (Progress Records 1993)
 CD - Progress Yourself (Progress Records 1996)

References

External links
 Official profile on MySpace
 Your Choice Records

Musical groups from Oslo
Musical groups established in 1988
Musical groups disestablished in 1994
Musical groups reestablished in 2002
Musical groups disestablished in 2008